Walmerson García Praia (born 13 January 1994), known as Walmerson or Wal, is a Brazilian professional footballer who plays as a forward.

Career

Club
On 25 January 2019, FC Banants announced that Walmerson had moved to Tokyo Verdy.

On 17 January 2020, Floriana announced the signing of Walmerson.

Career statistics

Club

References

External links
 

1994 births
Living people
Brazilian footballers
Association football forwards
Marília Atlético Clube players
Coimbra Esporte Clube players
Guaratinguetá Futebol players
Rio Branco Esporte Clube players
Luverdense Esporte Clube players
FC Gandzasar Kapan players
FC Urartu players
Tokyo Verdy players
Floriana F.C. players
Campeonato Brasileiro Série D players
Armenian Premier League players
J2 League players
Brazilian expatriate footballers
Brazilian expatriate sportspeople in Armenia
Brazilian expatriate sportspeople in Japan
Brazilian expatriate sportspeople in Malta
Expatriate footballers in Armenia
Expatriate footballers in Japan
Expatriate footballers in Malta